House of Ho is an American reality television series on HBO Max. The series focuses on a Vietnamese American family in Houston. Priyanka Bose of The A.V. Club called the show "a bleak portrayal of life as a crazy rich Asian". The series first season was released on December 10, 2020. The second season was released on August 25, 2022.

Cast
 Binh Ho
 Hue Ho
 Judy Ho
 Lesley Ho
 Washington Ho
 Aunt Tina
 Cousin Sammy
 Nate Nguyen
 Kim Ho (season 2)
 Bella Ho (season 2)
 Tran Nguyen (season 2)
 Tammy Gee (season 2)
 Carlton Kon (season 2)
 Vanessa Kon (season 2)

Episodes

Series overview

Season 1 (2020)

Season 2 (2022)

Release
House of Ho s first season was released on December 10, 2020. The second season was released on August 25, 2022, with the first three episodes available immediately, followed by three episodes on September 1, and the final four episodes on September 8.

See also
 Bling Empire

References

External links

 House of Ho at HBO Max
 House of Ho at IMDb

2020 American television series debuts
2020s American reality television series
Asian-American culture in Houston
Asian-American television
English-language television shows
HBO Max original programming
Television series by Lionsgate Television
Television series about families
Television shows set in Houston